Mahmud Deobandi (also known as Mulla Mahmud) (died 1886) was a Muslim scholar who became the first teacher at Darul Uloom Deoband. His most notable student is Mahmud Hasan Deobandi.

Biography
Mahmud was a fellow of Muhammad Qasim Nanautawi, the founder of Darul Uloom Deoband. He studied ahadith with Shah Abdul Ghani. In 1866, when Darul Uloom Deoband was established, he was appointed as a teacher. He taught in Darul Uloom Deoband for twenty years until he died in 1886. He is buried in Deoband.

His students include Mahmud Hasan Deobandi, Ashraf Ali Thanwi and Azizur Rahman Usmani.

References

1886 deaths
Academic staff of Darul Uloom Deoband
People from Deoband
Sunni Muslim scholars of Islam
Deobandis